Galveztown may refer to:

 Gálveztown (brig sloop), a famous ship in the fleet of the Spanish Empire.
 Galveztown, Louisiana, an 18th-century settlement near present-day Galvez, Louisiana.
 The original name of Galveston, Texas

See also
 Galveston (disambiguation)